Crenicichla anamiri is a species of cichlid native to South America. It is found swimming in the Middle rio Xingu and rio Bacajá, upstream of Volta Grande do Xingu in Brazil.

References

anamiri
Freshwater fish of Brazil
Taxa named by Priscila Madoka Miyake Ito
Taxa named by Lúcia Helena Rapp Py-Daniel
Fish described in 2015